Cornelia Behm (born 20 September 1951 in Kleinmachnow, Brandenburg) is a German politician and member of Alliance 90/The Greens in the Bundestag from 2002 till 2013.

External links 
 Official website (archived)

1951 births
Living people
People from Potsdam-Mittelmark
Humboldt University of Berlin alumni
Members of the Bundestag for Brandenburg
Female members of the Bundestag
21st-century German women politicians
Members of the Bundestag 2009–2013
Members of the Bundestag 2005–2009
Members of the Bundestag 2002–2005
Members of the Bundestag for Alliance 90/The Greens